Mohamed Amine Sbaï (born 5 November 2000) is a French professional footballer who plays as a winger for Grenoble in the French Ligue 2.

Professional career
Sbaï is a youth product of Nîmes, EP Vergèze and Le Crès. He began his senior career with Alès in 2019. He finished as top scorer of the shortened 2020-21 Championnat National 3 season with 9 goals. For the 2021-22 season, he transferred to Sète where he scored 6 goals in 29 appearances. He transferred to the Ligue 2 club Grenobole on 25 May 2022.

Personal life
Born in France, Sbaï is of Moroccan descent. His brothers, Salaheddine and Hatim Sbaï are also professional footballers.

References

External links
 

2000 births
Living people
Footballers from Nîmes
French footballers
French sportspeople of Moroccan descent
Association football wingers
Olympique Alès players
FC Sète 34 players
Grenoble Foot 38 players
Ligue 2 players
Championnat National players
Championnat National 3 players